Bangladesh–Serbia relations refer to the bilateral relations between Bangladesh and Serbia. Relations between Yugoslavia and Bangladesh were officially established in 1971, immediately after the independence of Bangladesh. This has continued to present with Serbia being the successor state to Yugoslavia. Serbia does not have a resident ambassador in Bangladesh, only an honorary consul. Bangladesh has a non resident embassy in Rome.

Economic cooperation 
Bangladesh and Serbia have shown their mutual interest to expand the bilateral economic activities between the two countries and have been taking necessary steps in this regard. Serbia has expressed its interest to form joint ventures with Bangladeshi firms for increasing bilateral trade and investments. Bangladeshi pharmaceutical products, textile items, ready made garments and leather goods have been identified as products with good potential in the Serbian market.

See also 
 Yugoslavia and the Non-Aligned Movement

References 

Serbia
Bilateral relations of Serbia